Entoloma holoconiotum  is a mushroom in the family Entolomataceae. It was originally described as Nolanea holoconiota by David Largent and Harry Thiers in 1972. Machiel Noordeloos and Co-David transferred it to the genus Entoloma in 2009. The species can be found in conifer forests in western North America.

The cap is tan or orangish and ranges from 2–6 cm in diameter. The gills are white. The stalks are pale yellow, measuring 3–7 cm tall and 3–4 mm wide. The spores are brownish pink.

Similar species include Entoloma cuneatum, E. propinquum, and E. vernum.

See also
List of Entoloma species

References

External links

Entolomataceae
Fungi of North America
Fungi described in 1972
Taxa named by Harry Delbert Thiers